The Innere Stadt (Central Bavarian: Innare Stod) is the 1st municipal district of Vienna located in the center of the Austrian capital. The Innere Stadt is the old town of Vienna. Until the city boundaries were expanded in 1850, the Innere Stadt was congruent with the city of Vienna. Traditionally it was divided into four quarters, which were designated after important town gates: Stubenviertel (northeast), Kärntner Viertel (southeast), Widmerviertel (southwest), Schottenviertel (northwest).

The Ringstraße circles the Innere Stadt along the route of the former city walls.

The first district is, with a workforce of 100,745, the largest employment locale in Vienna. This is partially due to tourism, as well as the presence of many corporate headquarters due to the district's central location.

Geography 
Innere Stadt is the central district of Vienna. It borders Leopoldstadt in the northeast, Landstraße in the east, Wieden and Mariahilf in the south, Neubau and Josefstadt in the west, and Alsergrund in the north. The district border, starting at Urania, follows Wienfluss, Lothringerstraße, Karlsplatz, Gedreidemarkt, Museumsplatz, Museumstraße, Auerspergstraße, Landesgerichtsstraße, Universitätsstraße, Maria-Theresien-Straße and the Donaukanal.

History 

Before 1850, Innere Stadt was physically equivalent with the city of Vienna. See History of Vienna for details about the history of Vindobona and Vienna, as well as historical significance after 1850.
On November 2, 2020, a shooting occurred in the municipality at 6 locations, killing 4 people and injuring 22 at 20:00.

Places of interest 
 Albertina
 Burgtheater
 Friedrich-Schmidt-Platz
 Graben
 Hofburg Imperial Palace
 Kapuzinergruft
 Kärntner Straße
 Lutheran City Church
 Museum of Art History
 Museum of Natural History
 Maria am Gestade Church
 Palais Ephrussi
 Pestsäule (a plague column)
 Peterskirche
 Rathaus, Vienna
 Ruprechtskirche
 Schottenstift
 Stadtpark, Vienna
 Stephansdom
 Vienna State Opera
 Virgilkapelle
 Parliament Building
 Palace of Justice
 Main Building of the University of Vienna
 Volksgarten

Population

Over time 
Population has been declining ever since its peak of 73,000 in 1880, until it hit the lowest recorded value of 17,000 in 2001. Although population has been increasing slightly since then, Innere Stadt continues to remain the least populated district in Vienna.

Structural 
In 2001, 28.1% of the district's population was over 60 years of age, above the city average of 22.2%. The percentage of people under 15 years of age was 9.8%. The female population of 53.3% was also above city average.

Origin and language 
At 15.5%, the percentage of foreign residents in Innere Stadt was 2% under city average for the year 2001. 2.8% of the population had EU Citizenship (Germany excluded), 2.7% were citizens of Serbia and Montenegro, and 2.2% were German citizens. In total, 25.6% of the population were born in a foreign country. 79% of residents listed German as their language of choice. 4.0% spoke primarily Serbian, 1.8% Hungarian, and 1.4% Croatian. 14.3% spoke other languages.

Religion 
Roman Catholics made up 51.3% of the Innere Stadt population in 2001, followed by 6.6% Protestants, 5.1% Orthodox Christians, 3.3% Jews. 22.7% were listed as non-confessional.

Politics 
The Bezirksvorsteher (district director) has been a member of the conservative ÖVP party since 1946. Former Bezirksvorsteher Ursula Stenzel has spoken out against holding events in the inner city, citing concerns regarding noise pollution. Her comments have drawn criticism from other parties, especially the social democratic SPÖ.

Coat of arms 
The first district's coat of arms is a white cross on a red background. It is also the coat of arms for the City of Vienna and the State of Vienna. The current coat of arms dates back to around 1270, when it first appeared on the minted "Wiener Pfennige" coins. It may have been based on the flag of the King of the Romans' forces during the Middle Ages, as the combat flag of Rudolph I of Germany featured a similar design.

Notes

References 
 "Wien - 1. Bezirk - Innere Stadt", Wien.gv.at, 2008, webpage (15 subpages): Wien.gv.at-innerestadt (in German).
 Grabovszki, Ernst: Innere Stadt, Wien, 1. Bezirk. Verlag Sutton, Erfurt 2002,

External links 

  History of Innere Stadt at the City of Vienna homepage.
  UNESCO rationale for inclusion of Vienna inner district into world cultural heritage list.
  General information about Innere Stadt from the Green party.
  Historical core of Vienna

 
Districts of Vienna
World Heritage Sites in Vienna
Historic districts
Katastralgemeinde of Vienna